Unconditional Love is a 2002 American mid-life re-invention comedy film co-written and directed by PJ Hogan ("My Best Friend's Wedding") and starring Kathy Bates, Rupert Everett, Dan Aykroyd, and Meredith Eaton.  The film follows Grace Beasley, an archetypal timid and repressed homemaker who, in the wake of a sudden, unexpected marital separation and her favorite pop star's untimely death, takes a plane to England to attend the entertainer's funeral. The film was released in the United Kingdom on 23 August 2002.

Plot
Grace Beasley has been content with life as a housewife. One morning, Grace wins tickets to a concert by her favorite singer. Grace is ecstatic, but soon learns her husband is leaving her, and also that her son is leaving his wife.  Grace arrives at the concert, only to learn it has been cancelled due to the murder of the singer.  Grace decides to travel to England for the singer's funeral. She soon meets the closeted singer's former lover and they plot to secretly change his burial clothing to his beloved pink bathrobe.  Grace and Dirk then leave for Chicago and track down and kill the Cross Bow Killer, who has been murdering singers. The adventure transforms Grace, and she faces the problems of her marriage with a new outlook on the meaning of love.

Cast
Kathy Bates as Grace Beasley
Rupert Everett as Dirk Simpson
Meredith Eaton as Maudey
Lynn Redgrave as Nola Fox
Stephanie Beacham as Harriet Fox-Smith 
Richard Briers as Barry Moore
Dan Aykroyd as Max Beasley
Jonathan Pryce as Victor Fox
Pat Finn as Keith
Peter Sarsgaard as Window Washer
Barry Manilow as himself
Julie Andrews as herself

Critical reception
The film was shot in late 1999 and early 2000 in Chicago and England, but New Line Cinema continually postponed the American release, leaving the film on the shelf until finally premiering it on the Starz network in August 2003 and then sending it direct-to-DVD that October. The film has generally received negative reviews from film critics.

Christopher Null wrote, "It's a sloppy mishmash of stories...none of which stand on their own and which crash disastrously when combined. Bates comes off as dippy and distant. Everett comes of [sic] as mean and crusty. Pryce is just inexplicable with a gray pompadour and blue sequins. And Manilow rocks. Er..."

Jason Bovberg had slightly kinder things to say about the film. "As a dark comedy, Unconditional Love can be occasionally effective. There are a few moments in this film that had me laughing quite hysterically. Merely the sight of Jonathan Pryce shuffle-dancing through clouds over the opening credits loads the film with promise. And Meredith Eaton as Maudey steals every scene she's in. But in the end, you can't escape the fact that Bates has difficulty carrying this movie and in fact, doesn't seem to really understand the type of film she's in."

DVD
The film is available on DVD and includes the film's trailer, and a deleted scene.

See also
 Can't Smile Without You

References

External links
 
 
 

1999 films
American LGBT-related films
Films directed by P. J. Hogan
Films scored by James Newton Howard
2000s English-language films
1990s English-language films
1990s American films
2000s American films